Philani Bhekizizwe Lancelot Kubheka (born 18 May 1979), known as just Philani, is a South African soccer player who played as a striker. He is renowned for his trickery and explosive pace.

Philani was strongly linked with a move to A-League club Adelaide United but the deal did not go ahead because the club decided to sign Brazilian Cristiano dos Santos instead.

Club statistics

References

1979 births
Living people
People from Okhahlamba Local Municipality
Association football forwards
South African soccer players
South African expatriate sportspeople in Malaysia
Expatriate footballers in Vietnam
Negeri Sembilan FA players
Orlando Pirates F.C. players
Expatriate footballers in Malaysia